"Elegantly Wasted" is the title track and first single released from the album Elegantly Wasted by Australian band INXS, released in Europe, Japan, Australia, South Africa, Canada and the United States. The song is said to have been written after Michael Hutchence and Bono from U2 went out for a "night on the town".

Released as a single on 10 March 1997, the song became the band's fourth and final number-one single in Canada, topping the RPM Top Singles chart for three weeks in May and June 1997. In the United States, the song did not chart on the Billboard Hot 100 due to rules in place at the time regarding commercial releases, but it did reach number 27 on the Billboard Radio Songs chart. The song also peaked at number 48 in the band's native Australia and reached the top 40 in Iceland, Switzerland, and the United Kingdom.

Lyrical content
After an argument with Noel Gallagher of Oasis, Hutchence added some additional vocals to the chorus, which the rest of the band were unaware of until months after the album's release. When listening for it, the chorus can either be heard as "I am elegantly wasted" or "I am better than Oasis". This was further to an altercation between Hutchence and the Gallagher brothers at the 1996 Brit Awards. At the awards, Noel Gallagher collected an award from Hutchence by saying, "Has-beens should not be presenting awards to gonna-be's." It was also reported that Liam and Hutchence had a scuffle backstage with Hutchence throwing a fire extinguisher at Liam following some disparaging remarks he made about his then lover Paula Yates.

B-sides
The B-sides on the first CD single included INXS's biggest hit "Need You Tonight", a 1995 mix of "Original Sin" by Chris & James and a remix of album track "I'm Only Looking" from Full Moon, Dirty Hearts by David Morales. The second CD single included three remixes of "Elegantly Wasted" by dance artists Shagsonic and G-Force.

Music video
Directed by English music director Walter Stern, the video was filmed in December 1996, and features the band wandering around an airport terminal as the awaiting passengers begin to watch and interact with the band. A small set was built in Los Angeles to resemble the interiors of an airport with extras being brought in to play the passengers. The video also includes snippets and brief clips taken from the Elegantly Wasted video shoot which were photographed and used for the album's cinematic cover art.

Track listings
Australasian and UK CD1, Japanese CD single
 "Elegantly Wasted" (radio edit) – 3:53
 "Need You Tonight" – 3:01
 "Original Sin" (Epic Adventure) – 9:37
 "I'm Only Looking" (The Morales Bad Yard mix) – 8:17

Australasian and UK CD2
 "Elegantly Wasted" (radio edit) – 3:53
 "Elegantly Wasted" (Shagsonic remix) – 7:56
 "Elegantly Wasted" (Shagsonic dub) – 8:25
 "Elegantly Wasted" (G-Force and Seiji Remix) – 6:36

UK cassette single and European CD single
 "Elegantly Wasted" (radio edit) – 3:53
 "Need You Tonight" – 3:01

Charts

Weekly charts

Year-end charts

Release history

References

1997 singles
1997 songs
INXS songs
Mercury Records singles
Music videos directed by Walter Stern
RPM Top Singles number-one singles
Song recordings produced by Bruce Fairbairn
Songs written by Andrew Farriss
Songs written by Michael Hutchence